Frederick James Prinze Sr. (born Frederick Karl Pruetzel; June 22, 1954 – January 29, 1977) was an American stand-up comedian and actor. Prinze was the star of the NBC-TV sitcom Chico and the Man from 1974 until his death in 1977. Prinze is the father of actor Freddie Prinze Jr.

Early life 
Prinze was born Frederick Karl Pruetzel (German spelling: Prützel) at Saint Clare's Hospital in Manhattan, New York City, the son of Edward Karl Pruetzel and Maria de Gracia Pruetzel (née Graniela y Ramirez). His mother was a Puerto Rican Catholic and his father was a German Lutheran immigrant who had arrived in the U.S. as a youth in 1934. Prinze was raised in a mixed neighborhood in Washington Heights, New York City. When Prinze was a small child, his mother enrolled him in ballet classes to deal with a weight problem. Without telling his parents, Prinze successfully auditioned for the LaGuardia High School of Performing Arts, where he was introduced to drama and continued ballet—and where he discovered his gift for comedy while entertaining crowds in the boys' restroom. He dropped out of school in his senior year to become a stand-up comedian.

Career 

Prinze worked at several comedy clubs in New York City, including The Improv and Catch a Rising Star, where he introduced himself to audiences as a "Hunga-rican" (part Hungarian, part Puerto Rican). Although his mother was in fact Puerto Rican, his father was a German immigrant with no Hungarian ancestry. Prinze's son, Freddie Prinze Jr., has stated that his father was half German/half Puerto Rican many times. This is also verified by census records as well as Prützel/Pruetzel family accounts. For the sake of his budding comedic career, he legally changed his surname to "Prinze". He chose this name because, according to his friend David Brenner, Prinze originally wanted to be known as the king of comedy, but since Alan King already had that last name and sobriquet, he would be the prince of comedy instead. During 1973, Prinze made his first television appearance on one of the last episodes of Jack Paar Tonite. In December 1973, his biggest break came with an appearance on The Tonight Show Starring Johnny Carson. Prinze was the first young comedian to be asked to have a sit-down chat with Carson on his first appearance. Prinze appeared on and guest-hosted The Tonight Show on several other occasions. He also appeared on The Midnight Special to perform his comic routine.

From September 1974 until his death in January 1977, Prinze starred as Francisco "Chico" Rodriguez in the NBC TV series Chico and the Man with Jack Albertson. The show was an instant hit. Prinze made several appearances on The Dean Martin Celebrity Roasts, most notably the roasts for Sammy Davis Jr. and Muhammad Ali. In 1975, he released a comedy album that was taped live at Mister Kelly's in Chicago titled Looking Good—his catch phrase from Chico and the Man. In 1976, he starred in a made-for-TV movie, The Million Dollar Rip-Off. Prinze had a little-known talent for singing, examples of which could be heard in the background of the title song of the Tony Orlando and Dawn album To Be With You, in his appearances on their variety show, and on rare occasions on his own sitcom. About four months before his death, Prinze had signed a five-year deal with NBC worth $6 million.

Personal life 

On October 13, 1975, Prinze married Katherine (Kathy) Elaine (Barber) Cochran, with whom he had one child, son Freddie Prinze Jr., who was born March 8, 1976. Prinze was arrested for driving under the influence of Quaalude on November 16, 1976. A few weeks later his wife filed for divorce. Prinze had been romantically linked to actresses Raquel Welch and Pam Grier, whom he met in 1973. Grier recalls their relationship in chapter nineteen of her memoir, My Life in Three Acts. After his break-up with Grier, Prinze dated actress Lonette McKee for a time during 1976. Prinze was very close friends with singer Tony Orlando; Orlando appeared on Chico and the Man, and Prinze appeared on Orlando's variety show. As he started to make more money, Prinze took martial arts lessons from Robert Wall, a student of Bruce Lee, who appeared in Enter the Dragon and Return of the Dragon. Soon after, Wall became godfather to Prinze's newborn son.

Death 
Prinze suffered from depression, which deepened in the weeks after his wife filed for divorce. On the night of January 28, 1977, after talking on the telephone with his estranged wife, Prinze received a visit from his business manager, Marvin "Dusty" Snyder. While Snyder was visiting him, Prinze put a gun to his head and shot himself. He had purchased this gun in the presence of Jimmie "JJ" Walker and Alan Bursky, although it was long rumored that Bursky gave him the gun. Prinze was rushed to the UCLA Medical Center and placed on life support following emergency surgery. His family removed him from life support, and he died at 1 p.m. on January 29.

Prinze had a history of playing Russian roulette to frighten his friends for his amusement, though he made farewell phone calls to numerous family members and friends on the night of his death and left a note stating that he had decided to take his life. In 1977, the death was ruled a suicide. However, in a 1983 civil case brought by his mother, wife, and son against Crown Life Insurance Company, the jury found that his death was medication-induced and accidental, which enabled the family to collect $200,000 in life insurance. This followed a $1,000,000 out-of-court settlement with his psychiatrist and doctor to end their malpractice suit for allowing him access to a gun and overprescribing him Quaalude (as a tranquilizer).

Prinze is interred at Forest Lawn Memorial Park in the Hollywood Hills of Los Angeles, near his father, Edward Karl Pruetzel. His son, Freddie Prinze Jr., who was less than one year old when his father died, did not speak publicly about his father's death until he discussed it in the documentary Misery Loves Comedy (2015), directed by Kevin Pollak.

Legacy 
 Prinze's mother wrote a book about her son, The Freddie Prinze Story (1978).
 Can You Hear the Laughter? The Story of Freddie Prinze (September 1979) is a TV biopic.
 Prinze's life and death were a focal point of one of the storylines in the movie Fame (1980), set in Prinze's alma mater, the LaGuardia High School of Performing Arts.
 Prinze received a star on the Hollywood Walk of Fame on December 14, 2004, honoring his contribution to the television industry. Actor and comedian George Lopez has acknowledged that he paid for Prinze's star.

References

Further reading

External links 

 
 

1954 births
1977 deaths
American people of Puerto Rican descent
American stand-up comedians
American male television actors
Hispanic and Latino American male actors
American people of German descent
People from Washington Heights, Manhattan
Male actors from New York City
Burials at Forest Lawn Memorial Park (Hollywood Hills)
20th-century American male actors
Fiorello H. LaGuardia High School alumni
20th-century American comedians
American male comedians
Comedians from New York City
Suicides by firearm in California